Ualosi Kailea (born 28 October 1978, in Ha'ateiho) is a Tongan rugby union Wing. He was a member of the Tonga national rugby union team and participated with the squad at the 2007 Rugby World Cup.

References

Male rugby sevens players
1978 births
Living people
Rugby union props
Tongan rugby union players
People from Tongatapu